Pistols for Breakfast is a 1919 short comedy film featuring Harold Lloyd. A print of the film survives in the Museum of Modern Art film archive.

Plot
A young man (Fay) goes out to eat breakfeast with his friend (Harrison). As a restaurant "regular" with a pistol threatens to eat everyone's bacon, the two friends flee.

Cast
 Harold Lloyd 
 Snub Pollard 
 Bebe Daniels  
 Sammy Brooks
 Billy Fay
 Estelle Harrison
 Lew Harvey
 Bud Jamison
 Dee Lampton
 Gus Leonard
 Fred C. Newmeyer
 James Parrott
 Dorothea Wolbert
 Noah Young

See also
 List of American films of 1919
 Harold Lloyd filmography

References

External links

1919 films
American silent short films
1919 comedy films
1919 short films
American black-and-white films
Films directed by Alfred J. Goulding
Silent American comedy films
American comedy short films
1910s American films